The Benton County National Bank is a historic bank building at 123 West Central Street in Bentonville, Arkansas.  It is an elegant Classical Revival structure, designed by the regional architect Albert O. Clark and completed in 1906.  It has a distinctive Roman-style temple front with three tall round-arch openings, which is sheltered by a projecting gable-pedimented Greek temple front supported by four marble columns with modified Corinthian capitals.  A parapet above the Roman front obscures a dome at the center of the building.

The building was listed on the National Register of Historic Places in 1983.

See also
National Register of Historic Places listings in Benton County, Arkansas

References

Bank buildings on the National Register of Historic Places in Arkansas
Neoclassical architecture in Arkansas
Commercial buildings completed in 1906
National Register of Historic Places in Bentonville, Arkansas
1906 establishments in Arkansas